The 1987 Rugby League Premiership was the 13th end of season Rugby League Premiership competition.

The winners were Wigan.

First round

Semi-finals

Final

References

Premiership